Jonathan Lambeth is a former actor who founded a public relations company called Fides Media.   In the 1980s he was famous in the United Kingdom for his acting role as Danny Kendall in the BBC children's drama series Grange Hill. After the end of his acting career he worked as a journalist and reporter for the Financial Times and the Daily Telegraph, and later as head of corporate media relations at AOL.

References

Living people
English male television actors
Year of birth missing (living people)